General elections were held in Sweden on 20 September 1970, two years ahead of schedule because of the opening of the newly unicameral Riksdag. The Social Democratic remained the largest party, winning 163 of the 350 seats and gathered enough support to remain in power under its 1969 elected leader, Prime Minister Olof Palme.

Results

Seat distribution

References

General elections in Sweden
Sweden
General
Sweden